Hamburgsund is a locality situated in Tanum Municipality, Västra Götaland County, Sweden with 818 inhabitants in 2010.

References

External links 
 Hamburgsund website

Populated places in Västra Götaland County
Populated places in Tanum Municipality